{{Infobox person
| image       = Hilton Caerdydd-Andrea Benfield.JPG
| name        = Andrea Byrne
| caption     =
| birthname   = Andrea Benfield
| birth_date  = 
| birth_place = Guildford, Surrey, England
| death_date  =
| death_place =
| education   = Tormead School 
| occupation  = Journalist
| alias       =
| title       =
| family      =
| spouse      = 
| children    =
| relatives   =
| networth    =
| credits     = Wales at Six • Wales This Week
| agent       =
| URL         = 
}}
Andrea Byrne (née Benfield; born 1978) is an English journalist and presenter, currently working for ITV Cymru Wales, where she presents Wales at Six and Wales This Week.

Personal life
Born in Guildford, Surrey, Byrne graduated from Southampton University with a degree in English literature, before gaining a postgraduate diploma in journalism at Highbury College, Portsmouth. Latterly, she has gained a political diploma through the Open University.

Byrne married Wales rugby player Lee Byrne on 1 January 2012. Byrne took a year-long sabbatical in June 2013, before returning to ITV Cymru Wales to anchor the relaunched Wales at Six.

Career

Byrne started her journalism and media career as a local radio reporter for Guildford-based County Sound Radio. She then joined local television station MyTV Portsmouth as a reporter, but when the station was forced to lay off staff, she was promoted to news editor at the station. When Portsmouth TV ceased broadcasting she moved to Oxford's local TV station, Six TV.

Byrne's ITV career began in 2004 when she joined Meridian Tonight as a reporter. She later moved to Thames Valley Tonight as a reporter. It was while here that she produced a series of special reports on the Royal Air Force, reporting on pilots and their training at RAF Odiham before they were posted to Afghanistan, which was also shown nationally on ITV2 and placed runner-up in the regional Royal Television Society awards.

Following the departure of Lucy Owen to BBC Wales' flagship news programme Wales Today in November 2007, Byrne applied for the resulting vacancy on Wales at Six. On 17 December, it was announced that she had beaten 80 other applicants to the post, and undertook her first show opposite Jonathan Hill on 14 January 2008. Prior to her debut, Benfield moved from Surrey to Cardiff Bay.

Since joining ITV Cymru Wales, Byrne has presented a number of various regional non-news programmes for the station, including the arts and entertainment series The Wales Show, documentary series Tidal Wales, ITV Cymru Wales weekly political programme Sharp End and coverage of the Royal Welsh Show and the National Eisteddfod.

Byrne has also acted as a presenter of the ITV Weekend News , debuting in June 2010.

She has previously appeared as an occasional presenter for the ITV Lunchtime News, ITV Evening News and ITV News at Ten, as well as guest appearances for GMTV and Daybreak''.

References

External links 
Andrea Byrne on Twitter
Andrea Byrne Official Website
Meet the news team, ITV Cymru Wales at itv.com
Riva Media – agent

1978 births
Living people
People educated at Tormead School
Alumni of the Open University
Alumni of the University of Portsmouth
Alumni of the University of Southampton
British radio journalists
English television journalists
English women journalists
ITN newsreaders and journalists
ITV regional newsreaders and journalists
People from Guildford
British women television journalists
British women radio presenters